Francisco Moran (born October 20, 1968) is an American Democratic politician and former mayor of Camden, New Jersey.

Early life and career 
Moran was born and raised in Camden and is a graduate of Woodrow Wilson High School. He is of Puerto Rican descent. His political career began in Camden when Milton Milan was elected mayor and Moran took his council member seat on the Third Ward by winning a special election. He won the seat by one hundred votes, defeating opponent Kirk Jones. In 1996, Moran described himself as grass roots and someone that the community can look up to and reach out to.  During the council race, Moran was pressed on representing the black community in Camden. Moran responded with, "Like I tell people, I hear gunshots, you hear gunshots. Unless we come together, we're not going to stop the gunshots."

Mayor of Camden 
Upon being elected mayor during a press conference Moran stated that, "I will be reaching out to the CEOs of these corporations...What are you really doing for Camden?" When asked about homelessness, Moran said that he had a "missionary heart" and that he was a Christian.

On March 5, 2021, Moran announced that he would be resigning as Mayor, effective April 30, 2021, before the expiration of his term. Camden City Council President Curtis Jenkins served as interim mayor until May 11, 2021 when councilmember Victor Carstarphen was appointed to fill Moran's unexpired term.

Personal life 
On August 19, 1989, Moran married Ivette Rivera. They have two children.

References 

1968 births
Mayors of Camden, New Jersey
New Jersey Democrats
People from Camden, New Jersey
Woodrow Wilson High School (New Jersey) alumni
Living people
American politicians of Puerto Rican descent
21st-century American politicians
Hispanic and Latino American mayors in New Jersey